Kathleen E. Harring is an American educator and the 13th president of Muhlenberg College in Allentown, Pennsylvania.

Early life and education
Herring graduated high school in 1976 from Tri-Valley High School in Pottsville, Pennsylvania. Harring received her bachelor's in psychology from Franklin & Marshall College, and then earned her master's and Ph.D. in social psychology at University of North Carolina at Chapel Hill.

Career
Harring began her academic career at Muhlenberg College as an assistant professor in the psychology department in 1984. She was appointed provost of Muhlenberg College by then-president John I. Williams in 2017. She was appointed interim president as interim president on June 19, 2019, following the departure of President John I. Williams, Jr., and officially named president on June 26, 2020. Harring was inaugurated November 12, 2021 after more a year delay due to the COVID-19 pandemic. She is the first female president of Muhlenberg College.

Awards and honors
In 1991 Harring received the Christian R. and Mary F. Lindback Foundation Awards for distinguished teaching.

References 

Living people
Franklin & Marshall College alumni
Heads of universities and colleges in the United States
Muhlenberg College faculty
University of North Carolina at Chapel Hill alumni
Year of birth missing (living people)